The Battle of Breitenfeld or First Battle of Breitenfeld (in older texts sometimes known as Battle of Leipzig), was fought at a crossroads near Breitenfeld approximately 8 km north-west of the walled city of Leipzig on 17 September (Gregorian calendar), or 7 September (Julian calendar, in wide use at the time), 1631. It was the Protestants' first major victory of the Thirty Years War.

The victory confirmed Sweden's Gustavus Adolphus of the House of Vasa as a great tactical leader and induced many Protestant German states to ally with Sweden against the German Catholic League, led by Maximilian I, Elector of Bavaria, and the Holy Roman Emperor Ferdinand II.

Preliminaries 

The Swedish phase of the Thirty Years War began when Gustavus Adolphus and his force of 13,000 landed at Peenemünde in 1630. Initially, Sweden's entrance into the war was considered a minor annoyance to the Catholic League and its allies; his only battles to this point had been inconclusive ones, or fought against generals of modest military ability.

Consequently, the Imperial Commander of the German Catholic League, Tilly, did not immediately respond to the arrival of the Swedes, being engaged in northern Italy. However, the effective end of the Mantuan War in 1631 ensured that the large Imperial army previously tied up there was now free to move into the German states.

Creating alliances 
 When the Protestant princes showed little interest in attaching themselves to the Swedish cause, Gustavus opted for "rough wooing." His troops moved south into Brandenburg, taking and sacking the towns of Küstrin and Frankfurt an der Oder. It was too late and too far to save one of Gustav's "occupied" allies, Magdeburg, from a horrific sack by Imperial troops, beginning on 20 May, in which a major portion of the population was murdered and the city burned. The Swedes turned the sack of Magdeburg to good use: broadsides and pamphlets distributed throughout Europe ensured that prince and pauper alike understood how the Emperor, or at least his troops, treated his Protestant subjects.

Over the next few months, Gustavus consolidated his bridgehead and expanded across northern Germany, attracting support from German princes and building his army from mercenary forces along the way. By the time he reached the Saxon border, his force had grown to over 23,000 men.

Strategic importance of Saxony 
In order for Swedes to attack the Imperial troops in the south, they needed to pass through Saxony. In order for Tilly's forces to attack Gustav's army, they too needed to pass through Saxony. The Electorate of Saxony had not been affected by war and had large quantities of resources that each army could utilise. In midsummer, General Tilly asked John George I for permission to pass through the territory; the elector declined permission, noting that Saxony had not been ravaged by war yet. 
Later Tilly invaded the Electorate of Saxony due to the fact that it was the shortest distance between his army and Gustav's and it possibly annulled the chance of a potential alliance between Saxony and the Imperials.

His plan was to avoid contact with the Swedes, and ultimately the Saxons, until his troops could unite with the units near Jena (about 5,000 seasoned professionals), and the larger force of Count Otto von Fugger, en route from Hesse. Gustav and John George united their forces, planning to meet Tilly somewhere near Leipzig.

Tactical overview 

The battle was overall a meeting engagement with both combatants agreeing to battle on the field. The forces all had different structural organization. The level of technology was roughly equivalent, with newer, lighter cannon and matchlocks giving the Swedes a slight advantage. Both armies were well supplied, and the terrain gave neither a distinct advantage.

Forces deployed

The forces deployed were roughly equal in strength with the Imperials being slightly outnumbered. The Protestant coalition fielded about 39,000 troops with 23,000 Swedes and 16,000 Saxons, and the Imperial army about 37,000. The Protestants had a considerable edge in cavalry numbers, about 13,000 (5,000 from Allies) to 9,000. Strength of heavy artillery was comparable, with the Swedes having a slight edge in quality and Imperial forces a marginal advantage in quantity. The Swedes had additional small artillery pieces (3 and 6 pounders) integrated into their infantry brigades and regiments, giving them a larger number of tubes overall and a huge firepower advantage in an infantry clash.

The Imperials had a considerable advantage in the number of trained infantry deployed, about 25,000 to the Swedes 15,000. The Saxons (Swedish allies) fielded about 9,000 untrained conscripts and militiamen, and had very few muskets. The Swedish brigade had more muskets and fewer pikemen than the Imperial tercios (who still retained large numbers of lighter firearms known as the arquebus or caliver); overall, the Protestants fielded about the same number of muskets as Imperial troops.

Force assessment 
The overall balance was relatively even. The disparity in overall numbers resulted from large levies of untrained soldiers. The number of heavy cannons was relatively close, with the Swedish having newer models and light cannon compensating for the disparity in heavy field pieces. The Swedes had a considerable advantage in cavalry numbers, although the Imperialist cavalry were better armored and better mounted. This balance would be tilted however by the Swedish practice of supporting their cavalry with detachment of musketeers.

Tilly also had a considerable numerical advantage in the number of veteran, trained infantry. Gustavus had a considerable advantage in his artillery arm; he had moved away from heavy siege artillery into more mobile field pieces, which because of their mobility and rate of fire were much more effective than the former per pound. The Swedes also fielded considerably more powerful muskets by ratio, had far more advanced equipment, and better drills to increase their rate of fire. More important, the Linear Formation  allowed most Swedish musketeers to fire at the same time, and allowed the Swedish infantry to match the Imperialist frontage with a smaller number of men, which would be crucial in the later phase of the battle. Finally, the Swedish aggressive assault method of firing by triple-ranked salvos at point blank range, compared to the Imperialist's more traditional way of firing by volley would prove to be a nasty shock to Tilly's tercios.

Disposition of forces 

The Swedes deployed their 15,000 infantry in brigades and two lines. The imperial army deployed 25,500 infantry in a single line of 17 tercios (1,500 infantrymen in each). The German allies extended the Swedish-Saxon front to be overall slightly longer than the Imperial. The imperial line had its cavalry evenly distributed on its flanks. The Swedes had their cavalry weighted to their right. The Saxon allies fielded their infantry in wedge formation with units in squares, and cavalry on their flanks. With their Saxon allies extending the Swedes' line, the Protestants had cavalry at the centre and their flanks.

Battle 
The battle started in the middle of the day and lasted over six hours. The first two hours consisted of an exchange of artillery fire. This was followed by an Imperial attack with cavalry from both wings to both ends of the Protestant line. The cavalry attack routed the Saxon troops on the Swedish left flank. The Imperial army then conducted a general attack to exploit the exposed left flank. The Swedes repositioned their second line to cover the left flank and counterattacked with their cavalry to both imperial flanks.

The attack on the Imperial left was led personally by Gustavus Adolphus, capturing the Imperial artillery and enveloping the Imperial left flank. The Swedes now had much greater weight of fire from their artillery, infantry, and the captured Imperial artillery. The Imperial line became disorganized under the heavy fire and was enveloped. The Imperial line collapsed and over 80% of Imperial forces were killed or captured.

Opening moves 

The combined Swedish-Saxon forces were to the north of Leipzig centred around hamlet of Podelwitz, facing southwest toward Breitenfeld and Leipzig. The battle began around mid-day, with a two-hour exchange of artillery fire, during which the Swedes demonstrated firepower in a rate of fire of three to five volleys to one Imperial volley. Gustavus had lightened his artillery park, and each colonel had four highly mobile, rapid firing, bronze-cast three pounders, the cream of Sweden's metallurgical industry. When the artillery fire ceased, Pappenheim's Black Cuirassiers charged without orders from Tilly, attempting to turn the Swedish right. Instead, their attack fell between Johan Banér's line and the Swedish reserves. They attacked six times to little effect; the small companies of musketeers dispersed between the squadrons of Swedish horse fired salvos at point blank range, disrupting the charge of the Imperial cuirassier and allowing the Swedish cavalry to counterattack at an advantage.  The same tactics worked an hour or so later when the Imperial cavalry charged the Swedish left flank. Following the rebuff of the seventh assault, General Banér sallied forth with both his light (Finnish and West Gaetlanders) and heavy cavalry (Smalanders and East Gaetlanders), forcing Pappenheim and his cavalry to quit the field in disarray, retreating 15 miles northwest to Halle.

During the charges of the Imperial cuirassiers, Tilly's infantry had remained stationary, but then the cavalry on his right charged the Saxon cavalry and routed it towards Eilenburg. There may have been confusion in the Imperial command at seeing Pappenheim's charge; in their assessment of the battle, military historians have wondered if Pappenheim precipitated an attempted double envelopment, or if he followed Tilly's preconceived plan. At any rate, recognizing an opportunity, Tilly sent the majority of his infantry against the remaining Saxon forces in an oblique march diagonally across his front.

Thwarting the Imperial attack 

Tilly ordered his infantry to march ahead diagonally to the right, concentrating his forces on the weaker Saxon flank. The entire Saxon force was routed, leaving the Swedish left flank exposed. Before the Imperial forces could regroup and change face towards the Swedes, the commander of the Swedish Left, Marshal Gustav Horn, refused his line and counter-attacked before the tercios could regroup and change face.

The Imperial tercios then faced the full brunt of the new Swedish firepower for the first time:

"...[Tilly] received a horrible, uninterrupted pounding from the king's light pieces and was prevented from coming to grips with the latter's forces." – Raimondo Montecuccoli, Imperial officer.

"First (saith he), giving fire unto three little Field-pieces that I had before me, I suffered not my muskettiers to give their volleyes till I came within Pistollshot of the enemy, at which time I gave order to the first rancks to discharge at once, and after them the other three: which done we fell pell mell into their ranckes, knocking them downe with the stocke of the Musket and our swords." – Lt. Colonel Muschamp

Annihilation of the Imperial force 

With the Imperial forces engaged, the Swedish right and centre pivoted on the refused angle, bringing them in line with Horn. Banér's cavalry, under the direct command of Gustavus Adolphus, attacked across the former front to strike the Imperial left and capture their artillery. As Tilly's men came under fire from their own captured batteries, the Swedish cannon, under Lennart Torstensson, rotated, catching the tercios in a crossfire.

After several hours of punishment, nearing sunset, the Catholic line finally broke. Tilly and Pappenheim were both wounded, though they escaped. Seven thousand Imperial soldiers were killed, and 6,000 captured with another 3,000 rounded up the following day at Leipzig. The Saxon artillery was recaptured, along with all the Imperial guns and 120 regimental flags.

Aftermath 
The outcome of the battle had a significant impact in both the short and long terms.

Short-term effect 
In the short term, the Catholic and Imperial forces were significantly hampered by the loss of most of the force. One hundred and twenty standards of the Imperial and Bavarian armies were taken (and are still on display in the Riddarholm church in Stockholm). After the battle, Gustavus moved on Halle, following the same track that Tilly had taken coming east to enforce the Edict of Restitution on the Electorate of Saxony. Two days later Gustav's forces captured another 3,000 men after a brief skirmish at Merseburg, and took Halle two days after that.

After the battle, the Catholic League or Imperial army under Tilly could field an army of only 7,000 men. The army had to be rebuilt. Gustavus Adolphus, on the other hand, had a larger army after the battle than before. The battle's outcome had the political effect of convincing Protestant German states to join his cause. Finally, with the seventy-two-year-old Tilly's recovery far from certain (and he did indeed die within six months while crossing the Lech river), and with no alternative commander at hand, Emperor Ferdinand II had no choice but to rehire Wallenstein.

Long-term consequences 

The totality of the victory confirmed Gustav's military innovations and guaranteed that the Swedes would remain engaged in the war for the foreseeable future. In the long term, the significant loss of forces and the creation of a strong Protestant anti-Imperial force required the Emperor and the Protestant and Catholic princes to rethink on the operational conduct of the war, and the diplomatic avenues they would pursue with it.

Gustav's success encouraged several other princes to join the cause of the Swedish king and his few allies. By the month's end, Hanover, the Hessian dukes, Brandenburg and Saxony were officially aligned against the empire, and France had agreed to provide substantially greater funding for Gustavus' armies. Although Gustavus was killed a year later at the Battle of Lützen, the military strength of the alliance had been secured through the addition of new armies. Even when Swedish leadership faltered it did not fail, and the influx of French gold ensured that the hostilities could continue.

Battlefield today 
The battlefield today is bisected by the A14 autobahn, which slices through the fields where the majority of the action occurred, between the original position of Tilly, at Breitenfeld, and the original positions of the Swedes and Saxons, around Podelwitz.

In the eastern portion of the village of Breitenfeld stands a monument to Gustav Adolf and the victory his army accomplished there in 1631. It was erected in 1831 on the two hundredth anniversary of the battle and bears the following inscription:

See also 

 Breitenfeld (1631) order of battle
 Hakkapeliitta
 Björneborgarnas marsch

Notes

References

Bibliography 

 
 
 
 
 
 

 
 
 
 

 
 
 
 
 

1631 in Europe
Conflicts in 1631
Breitenfeld (1631)
Breitenfeld 1631
Battles involving Saxony
Battles in Saxony
Breitenfeld 1631
1631 in the Holy Roman Empire
17th century in Saxony
Gustavus Adolphus of Sweden
History of Leipzig